is a Japanese actor. He has won two Japanese Academy Awards for best actor, for The Silk Road (1988) and Tsuribaka Nisshi 6 (1993). He has also won the Blue Ribbon Award for Best Actor for Get Up! and Tsuribaka Nisshi 14 (2003). Outside Japan he is best known for his role as Pigsy (Cho Hakkai) in Monkey.

Nishida serves as the current President of Japan Actors Union and Vice President of the Japan Academy Film Prize Organization Committee. He received the Order of the Rising Sun in 2018.

Early life and family 
Nishida was born Toshiyuki Imai on November 4, 1947, in Kōriyama, Fukushima, to Izumi and Kie Imai. His biological father Izumi worked at the Kōriyama Postal Savings Bureau, and was born to the family of a karō, a top-ranking samurai official. Izumi died when Nishida was young, and Kie raised him while working as a beautician. After Kie remarried, Nishida, five years old at the time, was adopted by Kie's younger sister and her husband, Miyo and Tatsuji Nishida, respectively. His adoptive father's ancestors served Shimazu Nariakira, the daimyo of Satsuma Domain, and defended Satsuma during the Anglo-Satsuma War.

Nishida and his adoptive parents lived at a Shinto shrine's office, and although Tatsuji worked at the Kōriyama City Hall, the family was barely making a living. Tatsuji took him to the movies in the weekends, which inspired Nishida to join the drama club at his elementary school. During middle school, he told his parents that he wanted to become an actor and received strong support from his parents. During high school, he moved to Tokyo to "learn standard Japanese". In 1968, he entered an acting school, and his parents moved to Tokyo to support him.

Career 
In Japan, he is best known for his fishing comedy series, Tsuribaka Nisshi ("The Fishing Maniac's Diary"), which currently spans 21 movies. Outside Japan Nishida may be best known for his portrayal of Pigsy in the first season of the TV series Monkey, or for his role in the 2008 film The Ramen Girl, as the sensei of American actress Brittany Murphy's character.

Nishida has received ten Japanese Academy Award nominations, winning twice, for best actor in The Silk Road in 1988 as Gakko, and for best actor in Tsuribaka Nisshi 6 in 1993. He won the Blue Ribbon Award for Best Actor in 2003 for Get Up! and Tsuribaka Nisshi 14.

In 2017, Nishida reprised his role as Yakuza underboss Nishino in Takeshi Kitano's Outrage trilogy to positive reviews.

In 2018, Nishida received the Order of the Rising Sun, Gold Rays with Rosette, alongside comedian Takeshi Kitano.

Nishida serves as President of Japan Actors Union and Vice President of the Japan Academy Film Prize Organization Committee. He is one of the 'Frontier Ambassadors' for his hometown of Kōriyama City.

Filmography

Film

Television
{| class="wikitable sortable"
|-
! Year
! Title
! Role
! class="unsortable" | Notes
! class="unsortable" | Source
|-
| 1974
| Shin Heike Monogatari 
| Hōjō Yoshitoki
| Taiga drama
|
|-
| 1977
| Kashin
| Yamagata Aritomo
| Taiga drama
|
|-
| 1977–1979
| Tokusō Saizensen
| Detective Yōzō Takasugi
|
| 
|-
| 1978
| Saiyuki| Cho Hakkai/Pigsy
|
|
|-
| 1981
| Onna Taikō-ki| Toyotomi Hideyoshi
| Taiga drama
| 
|-
| 1984
| Sanga Moyu| Tadashi Amō
| Lead role, Taiga drama
|
|-
| 1986
| Byakkotai| Kayano Gonbei
| 
|
|-
| 1988
| Takeda Shingen| Yamamoto Kansuke
| Taiga drama
| 
|-
| 1990
| Tobu ga Gotoku| Saigō Takamori
| Lead role, Taiga drama
|
|-
| 1995
| Hachidai Shogun Yoshimune| Tokugawa Yoshimune
| Lead role, Taiga drama
|
|-
|1998
|Oda Nobunaga: Tenka wo Totta Baka|Saitō Dōsan
|Special appearance, TV movie
|
|-
| 2000
| Aoi| Tokugawa Hidetada
| Lead role, Taiga drama
| 
|-
|rowspan=2|2003
| Musashi| Yamanouchi Hanbei
| Taiga drama
|
|-
| Shiroi Kyotō| Mataichi Zaizen
| 
|
|-
|rowspan=2|2005
| Tiger and Dragon| Hayashiyatei Donbei
| 
|
|-
| Hiroshima Showa 20 nen 8 Gatsu Muika| elder Toshiaki Yajima
| TV movie 
|
|-
| 2006
| Kōmyō ga Tsuji| Tokugawa Ieyasu
| Taiga drama
|
|-
| 2007
| The Family| Ichirō Ōkawa
| 
| 
|-
| 2009–2011
| Saka no Ue no Kumo
| Takahashi Korekiyo
|
|
|-
|rowspan=2|2010
| Wagaya no Rekishi| Yame Tokijiro
| Miniseries
|
|-
| Yae's Sakura| Saigō Tanomo
| Taiga drama
|
|-
| 2013–present
| Doctor-X|  Hiruma Shigekatsu
|
|
|-
|rowspan=2| 2014
| Nobunaga Concerto| Saitō Dōsan
|
|
|-
|Tokyo ni Olympic o Yonda Otoko|Masaji Tabata
|TV movie
|
|-
| 2015
| Tsuribaka Nisshi| Su-san
|
|
|-
| 2016
| Montage| Shinnosuke Sawada
| TV movie
|
|-
| 2017
| Kohaku| Katsumi Yoneda
| Lead role, TV movie
|
|-
| 2018
| Segodon| Narrator / Saigō Kikujirō
| Taiga drama
|
|-
| 2022
| The 13 Lords of the Shogun| Emperor Go-Shirakawa
| Taiga drama
| 
|-
|}

Variety Show

DubbingRobots'' (Bigweld)

Honours
Medal with Purple Ribbon (2008)
Order of the Rising Sun, 4th Class, Gold Rays with Rosette (2018)

References

External links

Official website (in Japanese)

1947 births
Living people
Japanese male actors
Actors from Fukushima Prefecture
Gr8! Records artists
Musicians from Fukushima Prefecture
Taiga drama lead actors
Recipients of the Medal with Purple Ribbon
Recipients of the Order of the Rising Sun, 4th class